Plesielephantiformes is an extinct clade of large herbivorous mammals and one of two suborders of the Proboscidea, a group containing elephants and their close relatives.

References

Prehistoric animal suborders
Mammal suborders
Prehistoric proboscideans